Chan Sau Ying (born 30 August 1970), also known as Wanet Chan, is a retired athlete from Hong Kong who specialised in the 100 metres hurdles. She represented her country at the 1992 and 1996 Summer Olympics, as well as three outdoor and two indoor World Championships.

She was Hong Kong's flagbearer in the opening ceremony of the 1996 Summer Olympics.

Her personal bests are 13.14 seconds in the 100 metres hurdles (Walnut 1994) and 8.32 seconds in the 60 metres hurdles (Montréal 1994). Both are still standing national records.

She competed for Mt. San Antonio College, where she won the CCCAA Heptathlon in 1993, and at the University of Southern California. In 1994 she won the hurdles at the Mt. SAC Relays with a time of 13.14 seconds. She placed fourth at the NCAA Division I final later that year with a run of 13.34 seconds. She repeated that finish at the 1995 NCAA final, with a time of 13.32 seconds.

International competitions

References

1970 births
Living people
Hong Kong female hurdlers
Olympic female hurdlers
Olympic athletes of Hong Kong
Athletes (track and field) at the 1992 Summer Olympics
Athletes (track and field) at the 1996 Summer Olympics
Commonwealth Games competitors for Hong Kong
Athletes (track and field) at the 1990 Commonwealth Games
Athletes (track and field) at the 1994 Commonwealth Games
Asian Games competitors for Hong Kong
Athletes (track and field) at the 1994 Asian Games
Athletes (track and field) at the 1998 Asian Games
World Athletics Championships athletes for Hong Kong
Japan Championships in Athletics winners
Doping cases in athletics
Hong Kong sportspeople in doping cases
University of Southern California alumni